Proposition 1D was a defeated California ballot proposition that appeared on the May 19, 2009 special election ballot. The measure was legislatively referred by the State Legislature. If approved, the proposition would have authorized a one-time reallocation of tobacco tax revenue to help balance the state budget.

Background
In February 2009, the State Legislature narrowly passed the 2008–2009 state budget during a special session, months after it was due. As part of the plan to lower the state's annual deficits, the State Legislature ordered a special election with various budget reform ballot propositions, among them Proposition 1D.

The proposition was part of Assembly Bill 17 (Third Extraordinary Session), which was authored by Assemblywoman Noreen Evans, a Democrat from Santa Rosa. The bill passed in the State Assembly by a vote of 75 to 3 and in the State Senate by a vote of 37 to 0.

Proposal
Proposition 1D, officially entitled "Budget Act of 2008.  Children and Families  Act: use of funds: services for children.", would have authorized a fund-shift of $268 million in annual tobacco tax revenue currently earmarked for First Five early childhood development programs under the terms of Proposition 10. That revenue, plus $340 million in unspent First Five tobacco tax money held in a reserve fund at the time, would have instead been used to pay for other state government health and human services programs that serve children, including Medi-Cal, foster care, child care subsidies, preschool programs, and more. Money for these programs came from the state's General Fund at the time.

At the time, 80% of First Five money was distributed to county governments for similar programs, including government "school readiness" programs for pre-schoolers, Medi-Cal health coverage to children whose family income is above the cap for that program, government parent-education training, food and clothing subsidies, and more. Under Proposition 1D, that revenue stream would have ceased for five years, essentially ending most First Five programs.

Results

References

External links
Text of Proposition 1D

1D